Monceau-sur-Sambre is a town of Wallonia and a district of the municipality of Charleroi, located in the province of Hainaut, Belgium.

It was a municipality of its own before the merger of the municipalities in 1977.

Monceau is located west of Charleroi centre, to the north of the N90 motorway and east of the R3. The parish church is dedicated to Saint Louis de Gonzague.

Sights 

The Château de Monceau-sur-Sambre, with its park and arboretum, lies to the south of the suburb, close to the N90.

People born in Monceau-sur-Sambre 

 , Belgian martyrdom (1908-1918)

References

External link

Sub-municipalities of Charleroi
Former municipalities of Hainaut (province)